Cyriaque Alexandre Rambolazafy is a Malagasy politician. A member of the National Assembly of Madagascar, he was elected as an independent; he represents the constituency of Ivohibe.

External links
Profile on National Assembly site

Year of birth missing (living people)
Living people
Members of the National Assembly (Madagascar)
Place of birth missing (living people)